BTTC Centre is a Class A 12-story green building located at Ortigas Avenue corner Roosevelt Avenue, Greenhills, San Juan, Metro Manila, Philippines.  It is the first green building in Greenhills, San Juan to receive a Gold pre-certification for Core & Shell under LEED. Developed by Hantex Corporation, it is an office, commercial and retail type of property with a floor plate of 1,384 square meters per floor. BTTC Centre is also among the 58 projects currently registered for LEED certification, together with the Zuellig Building in Makati and Megaworld 8 Campus Building and Wells Fargo Headquarters, which are both in Bonifacio Global City. It is also an IT-Center PEZA Certified Building.

Design and features

BTTC Centre is managed by real estate services firm CBRE Philippines. Completed in December 2012, this building has maintenance systems and recycles water with its built-in sewerage treatment plant, installed with double-glazed glass to provide abundant entry of light and also cut approximately around 70% of the heat from outside, keeping the building cool at all times. 

The BTTC Centre was designed by ADGo Architecture and Design, Inc. headed by its principal architect, Architect Daniel Go.

See also

 San Juan

References

Sustainable building
Buildings and structures in San Juan, Metro Manila
Office buildings in Metro Manila